Sport Vereniging The Brothers is a Surinamese football club based in Oost, Para District. The club presently competes in the Eerste Klasse, the 2nd tier of Surinamese football.

History
Founded in 2006, S.V. The Brothers is a satellite club of S.S.D. Monza 1912 from Italy. Jürgen and Chedric Seedorf, the brothers of Dutch International Clarence Seedorf helped to establish the club, for which they themselves played during the 2010–11 season. The colors of SV The Brothers consist of a red and white playing kit.

Competitive results

Honours
Lidbondentoernooi: Runners-up
 2008

District West (Coronie): Winners
 2008

References

External links
 SVB – Selection of SV The Brothers.
 IM Scouting.com – SV The Brothers (Competitive results)

Football clubs in Suriname
2006 establishments in Suriname